Horacio d'Almeida (born ) is a French male volleyball player. He was part of the France men's national volleyball team.

References

External links
 Profile at FIVB.org

1988 births
Living people
French men's volleyball players
French expatriate sportspeople in Spain
Place of birth missing (living people)
Mediterranean Games bronze medalists for France
Mediterranean Games medalists in volleyball
Competitors at the 2013 Mediterranean Games